Rosetta A. Ferguson (July 1, 1920November 18, 2015) was a politician in Michigan, USA.

Early life
Ferguson was born on July 1, 1920, in Florence, Mississippi, to parents Gaberil Sexton and Earnie Sexton.

Education
Ferguson attended public schools in New Orleans and Detroit. She later attended Detroit Institute of Technology.

Career
In 1961, Ferguson was a candidate in the primary for the position of delegate to Michigan state constitutional convention from Wayne County 5th district. On November 4, 1964, she was elected to the Michigan House of Representatives where she represented the 9th district from January 13, 1965, to 1972. On November 7, 1972, she was again elected to the Michigan house of representatives where she represented the 20th district from January 10, 1973, to 1978. She pushed for more coverage of ethnic history in textbooks. She was known for her opposition to drugs, especially marijuana legalization, and abortion. In an incident in 1977, on the house floor, Ferguson threw a glass ashtray at state representative Perry Bullard, which hit him in the head.

Personal life
Ferguson married in 1935 and had four children. She was a member of the NAACP. Ferguson was Baptist.

Death
Ferguson died on November 18, 2015, and was buried in Florence, Mississippi.

References

1920 births
2015 deaths
Burials in Mississippi
People from Florence, Mississippi
Baptists from Michigan
Baptists from Mississippi
American anti-abortion activists
Detroit Institute of Technology alumni
African-American women in politics
African-American state legislators in Michigan
Women state legislators in Michigan
Democratic Party members of the Michigan House of Representatives
20th-century African-American women
20th-century African-American politicians
21st-century African-American women
21st-century African-American people
20th-century American women politicians
20th-century American politicians
20th-century Baptists